Teunga  is a village in Phulpur tehsil  in Azamgarh district of Uttar Pradesh state, India. It comes under Teunga Panchayath. It belongs to Azamgarh division. It is located 36 km west from district headquarters Azamgarh, 2 km from Phulpur and 243 km from state capital Lucknow.

The Teunga pin code is 276304 and postal head office is Phoolpur.

Teunga is surrounded by Ahiraula to the (north), Pawai and Shahganj to the west, and Tahbarpur to the east.

Mau, Azamgarh, Jaunpur, Tanda are nearby cities to Teunga.

Teunga is in the border of the Azamgarh district and Jaunpur district. Shahganj in Jaunpur district is west of this village.

Demographics of Teunga 
Hindi and Urdu are the local languages.

How To Reach Teunga
By Rail

Khorason Road, and Didarganj Road are the very nearby railway stations to Teunga. Azamgarh is also a major railway station 33 km away.

Nearby railway stations
Khorason Road Railway Station (1 km away)
    
Didarganj Road Railway Station (7 km away)

Sarai Mir Railway Station (10 km away)
 
Sanjarpur Railway Station (15 km away)

Nearby airports
Varanasi Airport (81 km away)
    
Gorakhpur Airport (102 km away)
  
Bamrauli Airport (151 km away)

Amausi Airport (236 km away)

Nearby districts
Azamgarh (34 km away)
 
Jaunpur (49 km away)

Ambedkar Nagar (55 km away)
    
Mau (80 km away)

Nearby tourist places
Jaunpur (50 km away)
 
Basti (90 km away)
 
Sarnath (91 km away)
 
Varanasi (98 km away)

Gorakhpur (99 km away)

Nearby tehsils
Phulpur (2 km away)

Ahiraula (10 km away)

Pawai (15 km away)

Shahganj (21 km away)

Nearby cities
Azamgarh (34 km away)
 
Jaunpur (49 km away)
 
Ambedkar Nagar (55 km away)
   
Mau (80 km away)

Villages in Azamgarh district